According to traditional Chinese uranography, the modern constellation Hercules  is located in Three Enclosures (三垣, Sān Yuán)

The name of the western constellation in modern Chinese is 武仙座 (wǔ xiān zuò), which means "the immortal martial constellation".

Stars
The map of Chinese constellation in constellation Hercules area consists of :

See also
Traditional Chinese star names
Chinese constellations

References

External links
Hercules – Chinese associations
 香港太空館研究資源
 中國星區、星官及星名英譯表
 天象文學
 台灣自然科學博物館天文教育資訊網
 中國古天文
 中國古代的星象系統

Astronomy in China
Hercules (constellation)